Cañaris District (Kañaris in Quechua) is one of six districts of the province Ferreñafe in Peru.

Ethnic groups 
The people in the district are mainly indigenous citizens of Quechua or Cañari descendants of mitimaes. Quechua Inkawasi-Kañaris Quechua) is the language which the majority of the population (63.65%) learnt to speak in childhood, 35.68% of the residents started speaking using the Spanish language (2007 Peru Census).

References